River Hill High School is a public high school in Clarksville, Maryland, United States. It is part of the Howard County public schools system.

River Hill High School was awarded a "gold medal" by U.S. News & World Report. It was recognized by BusinessWeek as having the "Best Overall Academic Performance" in Maryland. It was also ranked 4th of 225 High Schools in the State of Maryland as of 2018.

It was rated the 165th best school in the nation by US News in 2013.

Students
River Hill High School opened in 1996. The school population peaked in 2002 with 1,755 students, but has steadily decreased with the opening of several other local high schools in Howard County to ease the population strain on existing schools.

Principals
Scott Pfeifer 1996-2004
Bill Ryan 2004-2010
Nick Novak 2010–2015
Kathryn McKinley 2015–2020
Mikaela Lidgard  2020–present

Awards
River Hill was named by the U.S. Department of Education a National Blue Ribbon School in 2007, one of only 40 high schools to receive that honor.

It is the home of Alliance Rocket, co-winners of the SPHERES Challenge 2011 Championship on the International Space Station.

Notable alumni
Ryan Pinkston (class of 2006), actor
Michael Campanaro, wide receiver, free agent
Kevin Johnson, cornerback for the Cleveland Browns
Kate Hackett, writer and actor
Donovan Pines, soccer player

References and notes

External links

Public high schools in Maryland
Educational institutions established in 1996
Public schools in Howard County, Maryland
1996 establishments in Maryland